Kadidiatou Diani (born 1 April 1995) is a French professional footballer who plays as a forward for Division 1 Féminine club Paris Saint-Germain and the France national team.

International career 
Diani has played for France at several youth levels, including in the 2012 FIFA U-17 Women's World Cup, where she scored four goals and helped her side winning the championship. She also played in the 2014 FIFA U-20 Women's World Cup, scoring one goal against New Zealand and helping France to finish in the third place. On 24 February 2023 she announced she would no longer play for the national team after captain Wendie Renard said she would step down to save her mental health. Diani said she wanted changes to be made to the way the team was managed.

Personal life
Born in France, Diani is of Malian descent.

Career statistics

Club

International

Scores and results list France's goal tally first, score column indicates score after each Diani goal.

Honours
Paris Saint-Germain
 Division 1 Féminine: 2020–21
 Coupe de France féminine: 2017–18, 2021–22

France
SheBelieves Cup: 2017

Individual
Division 1 Féminine Player of the Year: 2020–21

References

External links
 UEFA player profile
 
 
 

1995 births
Living people
French women's footballers
Paris Saint-Germain Féminine players
Paris FC (women) players
People from Ivry-sur-Seine
France women's youth international footballers
France women's international footballers
Women's association football forwards
2015 FIFA Women's World Cup players
French people of Malian descent
Footballers at the 2016 Summer Olympics
Olympic footballers of France
Division 1 Féminine players
Black French sportspeople
Footballers from Val-de-Marne
2019 FIFA Women's World Cup players
UEFA Women's Euro 2022 players
UEFA Women's Euro 2017 players